Camp Zachary Taylor was a military training camp in Louisville, Kentucky. It opened in 1917, to train soldiers for U.S. involvement in World War I, and was closed three years later. It was initially commanded by Guy Carleton and after the war its commanders included Julius Penn.  Its name (and some of its buildings) live on as the Camp Taylor neighborhood of Louisville.  It is named for Louisville resident and United States President Zachary Taylor.

Not to be confused with Fort Zachary Taylor, a place in Key West Florida used for a military base.

The novelist F. Scott Fitzgerald trained at the camp.

Mobilization station
84th Division

Demobilization station
1st Division September 1919
38th Division January 1919
84th Division July 1919

See also

 Camp Taylor, Louisville

References

External links

Camp Zachary Taylor, Louisville,Ky. on Facebook
   Images of Camp Taylor (Louisville, Ky.) in the University of Louisville Libraries Digital Collections

Closed installations of the United States Army
History of Louisville, Kentucky
Taylor
Military installations in Kentucky
Closed military facilities of the United States in the United States
Military installations established in 1917
Military installations closed in 1920
1917 establishments in Kentucky
1920 disestablishments in Kentucky